The Bormida (Bormia in Piedmontese language) is a river of north-west Italy.

Toponymy 
The hydronym Bormida derives from the pre-Roman Ligurian proto-form *bormo ('warm or bubbling water'), also linked to the names of the gods of the springs Bormō and Bormānus. Similar hydronyms are present in the region: the river Borbera and the river Borbore, but also the town of Bormio in Lombardy know since the ancient times for the thermal waters and the town of Burbons les bains in France known for the same reason. The root *borm- itself could have pre-Indo-European origins and, therefore, could be connected with the lost language (or languages) of Prehistoric inhabitants of Europe who occupied Northern Italy before the possible arrival of the Indo-Europeans.

Geography 

The Bormida rises in Liguria from the Rocca Barbena (close to Colle Scravaion) as 'Bormida di Millesimo, and flows at first through Liguria and then through Piedmont. After converging with the Bormida di Spigno near Bistagno it joins the Tanaro, of which it is the major tributary, north-east of Alessandria.

References

 

Rivers of Italy
Rivers of the Province of Savona
Rivers of the Province of Cuneo
Rivers of the Province of Asti
Rivers of the Province of Alessandria
Rivers of the Alps
Rivers of the Apennines